Chryseobacterium antarcticum  is a bacterium from the genus of Chryseobacterium which has been isolated from soil in the Antarctica.

References

Further reading

External links
Type strain of Chryseobacterium antarcticum at BacDive -  the Bacterial Diversity Metadatabase

antarcticum
Bacteria described in 2009